Waiorongomai River is the name of two rivers in the North Island of New Zealand.
 Waiorongomai River (Gisborne)
 Waiorongomai River (Wellington)